Chandigarh is a union territory and planned city in India. Chandigarh is bordered by the State of Punjab to the north, west and the south, and by the State of Haryana to the east, the states for which it serves as the capital. It constitutes the bulk of the Chandigarh Capital Region or Greater Chandigarh, which also includes the adjacent satellite cities of Panchkula and Mohali. It is located 260 km (162 miles) north of New Delhi and 229 km (143 miles) southeast of Amritsar.

Chandigarh is one of the earliest planned cities in post independence India and is internationally known for its architecture and urban design. The master plan of the city was prepared by Swiss-French architect Le Corbusier, which built upon earlier plans created by the Polish architect Maciej Nowicki and the American planner Albert Mayer. Most of the government buildings and housing in the city were designed by a team headed by Le Corbusier, Jane Drew and Maxwell Fry. Chandigarh's Capitol Complex—as part of a global ensemble of Corbusier's buildings—was declared a World Heritage Site by UNESCO at the 40th session of the World Heritage Conference in July 2016.

Chandigarh has grown greatly since its initial construction, and has also driven the development of two satellite cities in its neighbouring states. The metropolitan area of Chandigarh, Mohali and Panchkula collectively forms a "tri-city", with a combined population of over 1,611,770. The city has one of the highest per capita incomes in the country. The union territory has one of the highest Human Development Index among Indian states and territories. In 2015, a survey by LG Electronics ranked it as the happiest city in India on the happiness index.  In 2015, an article published by BBC named Chandigarh one of the few master-planned cities in the world to have succeeded in terms of combining monumental architecture, cultural growth, and modernisation.

Etymology
The name Chandigarh is a compound of Chandi and Garh. Chandi refers to the Hindu goddess Chandi and Garh means fortress. The name is derived from Chandi Mandir, an ancient temple devoted to the Hindu Goddess Chandi near the city in Panchkula District.

The motif or sobriquet of "The City of Beauty" was derived from the City Beautiful movement, which was a popular philosophy in North American urban planning during the 1890s and 1900s. Architect Albert Mayer, the initial planner of Chandigarh, lamented the American rejection of City Beautiful concepts and declared, "We want to create a beautiful city..." The phrase was used as a logo in official publications in the 1970s and is now how the city describes itself.

History

As part of the partition of India in 1947, the former British province of Punjab was divided into two parts, the mostly Hindu and Sikh East Punjab in India, and the mostly Muslim West Punjab in Pakistan. The capital of undivided Punjab, Lahore, had become part of Pakistan after the partition. Instead of shifting the capital to an already existing and established city, Jawaharlal Nehru, the first Prime Minister of India, envisioned an altogether new and modern city to be built to serve as the capital of Punjab. Partap Singh Kairon, then the Chief Minister of East Punjab, and Edward Nirmal Mangat Rai, then the Chief Secretary of East Punjab, were instrumental in creating Chandigarh as the capital of the state. In 1949, the American planner and architect Albert Mayer was commissioned to design a new city to be called "Chandigarh". The government carved out Chandigarh from about fifty Puadhi-speaking villages in the then-state of East Punjab, India. Shimla was the temporary capital of the state until Chandigarh was completed.

Albert Mayer developed a superblock-based city interspersed with green spaces, with an emphasis on cellular neighbourhoods and traffic segregation. His site plan took advantage of natural land characteristics; the land's gentle grade promoted proper drainage. Mayer stopped his work on the city after his architect-partner Matthew Nowicki died in a plane crash in 1950. Government officials recruited Le Corbusier to succeed Mayer and Nowicki, who utilized many elements of Mayer's original plan without attributing them to him.
Le Corbusier designed many administration buildings, including the High Court, the Palace of Assembly, and the Secretariat Building. Le Corbusier also designed the general layout of the city, dividing it into sectors. Chandigarh hosts the largest of Le Corbusier's many Open Hand sculptures, standing 26 metres high. The Open Hand (La Main Ouverte) is a recurring motif in Le Corbusier's architecture, a sign for him of "peace and reconciliation. It is open to give and open to receive." It represents what Le Corbusier called the "Second Machine Age". Two of the six monuments planned in the Capitol Complex which has the High Court, the Assembly, and the Secretariat, remain incomplete. These include Geometric Hill and Martyrs Memorial. Drawings were made, and they were begun in 1956, but they were never completed.

The capital city was officially shifted from Shimla to Chandigarh on 21 September 1953, though Chandigarh was formally inaugurated by India's first president, Rajendra Prasad on 7 October 1953.

During excavations at the time of the building of the city, some Indus valley artefacts were discovered, suggesting that the area that is today Chandigarh was home to some settlements of the Indus valley civilisation.
On 1 November 1966, after a long-drawn movement demanding the formation of a Punjabi state, the former state of Punjab was split in two. The western and northern mostly Punjabi-speaking portion became the present-day state of Punjab, while the eastern and southern Hindi- and Haryanvi-speaking areas became Haryana. Chandigarh ended up being located on the border of the two states, and both of them moved to incorporate the city into their respective territories. However, the city of Chandigarh was controlled directly by the central government and was to serve as the shared capital of the two states until a resolution could be reached.

Present-day Chandigarh was also the site of a short-lived late 18th-century principality, with a small fort at Mani Majra. As of 2016, many villages that predate the city are still inhabited within the modern blocks of some sectors, including Burail and Ottawa, while several other such villages lie on the margins of the city.

Geography

Location
Chandigarh is located by the foothills of the Shivalik Range of the Himalayas in northwest India. It covers an area of approximately 114 km2. It borders the states of Punjab and Haryana. It has an average elevation of 321 metres (1053 ft).

The city, lying in the northern plains, includes a vast area of flat, fertile land. Its northeast covers sections of Bhabar, while the remainder of its terrain is part of the Terai. Its surrounding cities are Mohali, New Chandigarh, Patiala, Zirakpur and Rupnagar in Punjab, and Panchkula and Ambala in Haryana.

Chandigarh is situated 44 km (28 miles) north of Ambala, 229 km (143 miles) southeast of Amritsar, and 250 km (156 miles) north of Delhi.

Climate

Chandigarh has a humid subtropical climate (Köppen: Cwa) characterised by a seasonal rhythm: very hot summers, mild winters, unreliable rainfall and great temperature variation. The city also receives occasional winter rains from the Western Disturbance originating over the Mediterranean Sea. The western disturbances bring rain predominantly from mid-December until the end of April, which can be heavier sometimes with strong wind and hail if the weather turns colder (during March–April months), which usually proves disastrous to local crops. Cold winds usually tend to come from the Himalayas that lie to the north, which receive snowfall during wintertime.

The city experiences the following seasons and the respective average temperatures:

 Monsoon: During the monsoon season (from early July to mid-September), Chandigarh receives moderate to heavy rainfall and sometimes heavy to very heavy rainfall (generally during August or September). Usually, the rain-bearing monsoon winds blow from the southwest/southeast. The city mostly receives heavy rain from the south (which is mainly persistent rain), but it generally receives most of its rain during the monsoon season either from the northwest or the northeast.
 Winter: Winters (November-end to February-end) are mild but can get chilly during peak winter weeks. Rain usually comes from the west during winter as a persistent rain for 2–3 days, sometimes with hailstorms.

Wildlife and biodiversity

Most of Chandigarh is covered by dense banyan and eucalyptus plantations. Ashoka, cassia, mulberry and other trees flourish in the forested ecosystem. The city has forests surrounding itself that sustain many animal and plant species. Deer, sambars, barking deer, parrots, woodpeckers, and peacocks inhabit the protected forests. Sukhna Lake hosts a variety of ducks and geese and attracts migratory birds from parts of Siberia and Japan in the winter season.
The Parrot Bird Sanctuary Chandigarh provides a home to a large number of parrots. Sukhna Wildlife Sanctuary was declared a wildlife sanctuary in 1998.

Heritage Trees of Chandigarh

Many trees in Chandigarh are given the status of the natural heritage of the city. The Chandigarh government has identified a list of 31 trees as Heritage Trees. The Department of Forest & Wildlife Chandigarh Administration is the nodal department for this purpose, and has published a detailed booklet about it. The trees in the city which are 100 years or more old have been given heritage status.

Landscape

Sukhna Lake, a 3 km2 artificial rain-fed lake in Sector 1, was created in 1958 by damming the Sukhna Choe, a seasonal stream coming down from the Shivalik Hills.

Chandigarh has a belt of parks running from sectors. It is known for its green belts and other special tourist parks. Sukhna Lake itself hosts the Garden of Silence. The Rock Garden, is located near the Sukhna Lake and has numerous sculptures made by using a variety of different discarded waste materials. The Zakir Hussain Rose Garden (which is also Asia's largest rose garden) contains nearly 825 varieties of roses in it and more than 32,500 varieties of other medicinal plants and trees. Other gardens include the Garden of Fragrance in Sector 36, Garden of Palms in Sector 42, Butterfly Park in Sector 26, Valley of Animals in Sector 49, the Japanese Garden in Sector 31, the Terraced Garden in Sector 33, Shanti Kunj Garden, the Botanical garden and the Bougainvillea Garden. There is also a Government museum and art gallery in Sector 10, Chandigarh.

Demographics

Population

 India census, Chandigarh had a population of 1,055,450, giving it a density of about 9,252 (7,900 in 2001) persons per square kilometre.

Males constitute 55% of the population and females 45%. The sex ratio is 818 females for every 1,000 males. The child sex ratio is 880 females per thousand males. Chandigarh has an effective literacy rate of 86.77% (based on population 7 years and above), higher than the national average; with male literacy of 90.81% and female literacy of 81.88%. 10.8% of the population is under 6 years of age. The population of Chandigarh forms 0.09 per cent of India in 2011.

There has been a substantial decline in the population growth rate in Chandigarh, with just 17.10% growth between 2001 and 2011. Since the 1951–1961 period, the growth rate has decreased from 394.13% to 17.10%, a likely cause being the rapid urbanisation and development in neighbouring cities. The urban population constitutes 97.25% of the total and the rural population makes up 2.75%, as there are only a few villages within Chandigarh, situated on its Western and South-Eastern border, and the majority of people live in the heart of Chandigarh.

Languages

English is the sole official language of Chandigarh. The majority of the population speaks Hindi (76.8%) while Punjabi is spoken by 22.03%. Government schools use English, Hindi, and Punjabi textbooks. The percentage of Punjabi speakers has fallen from 36% in 1981 to 22% in 2011, while that of Hindi speakers has increased from 51% to 78%.

Religion 

Hinduism  is the predominant religion of Chandigarh followed by 80.71% of the population. Sikhism is the second most popular religion in the city, followed by 13.11% of the people, followed by Islam at 4.87%. Minorities are Christians at 0.83%, Jains at 0.19%, Buddhists at 0.11%, those that didn't state a religion at 0.10%, and others are 0.02%.

There are several places of worship located all over the city, with many in each sector. One such historic temple located in the heart of the city is Mata Basanti Devi Mandir at Sector 24 of the city. The temple is dedicated to Goddess Shitala and specially visited by devotees during first Tuesday of Chaitra month after Holi. Chandi Mandir, Mata Mansa Devi Mandir and Mata Jayanti Devi Mandir are important Hindu temples located near Chandigarh.Nada Sahib Gurudwara, a famous place for Sikh worship lies in its vicinity. Apart from this, there are a couple of historical mosques in Manimajra and Burail. The Roman Catholic Diocese of Simla and Chandigarh serves the Catholics of the city, with a co-cathedral in the city. Most of the convent schools of Chandigarh are governed by this institution.

Government and politics

Administrator of the Union Territory 
Article 239 of the Constitution of India provides for the administration of the Union Territories by the President through an administrator. Since 1984 the Governor of Punjab has served concurrently as the administrator of Chandigarh. Banwarilal Purohit is the administrator of the union territory since September 2021.

Politics
Chandigarh, as a union territory, is not entitled to a state-level election: thus State Assembly elections are not held and it is directly controlled by the central government. One seat for Chandigarh is allocated in the Lok Sabha elections held every five years.

Kirron Kher (BJP) is the Member of Parliament elected in 2019 from the Chandigarh Lok Sabha constituency.

Civic administration 
The city is governed by a civic administration or local government headed by Municipal Commissioner Anindita Mitra and Mayor Sarbjit Kaur. The city comprises 35 wards represented by 35 elected councillors, and also nominates 9 councillors.

On 27 March 2022, Union Home Minister Amit Shah announced that the Chandigarh employees who were working under the Punjab service rules until 2022, would be working under the central civil services rules from 1 April 2022. The move was criticised by political parties such as the AAP, the INC and the Akali Dal.

Composition of Chandigarh Municipal Corporation after 2021 Chandigarh Municipal Corporation election as of December 2021:

Civic utilities 
The prime responsibilities of the civic body Municipal Corporation Chandigarh, are to ensure cleanliness and sanitation in the city, illumination of street lights, maintenance of parks, and sewerage disposal. The city has both brick and pipe sewers laid in four phases. In September 2020, the civic body announced that it would upgrade and renew the 50-year-old sewerage system. The pilot project for the 24x7 water supply is expected to begin in Chandigarh in May 2021, which was initially to start in September 2020 and end in March 2022. On 8 April 2021, the Chandigarh Smart City Ltd (CSCL) board is yet to take the final decision.

In 2021, the BJP ruled corporation had increased the water tariff by 1.5 to 2.5 times. This created a widespread discontent among the residents.

In 2021, there was an acute shortage of parking spaces. The problem was aggravated by an increase of 17% in parking rates by the Municipal Corporation. The increase in the waste collection charges, water tariff and property tax rates during the last five years 2016 to 2021 were unpopular among the public.

Cleanliness
In 2016, Chandigarh was the second cleanest city of India. In the years that followed, garbage from the city was not disposed of properly. The lack of a proper process or mechanism led to the garbage piled up at the Dadu Majra garbage dump site.

In 2021, Chandigarh fell 66 positions in the list of cleanest cities in India, once a point of pride for the city. The fall in cleanliness became an important poll issue. The residents were upset with the downfall in the cleanliness.

The government's handling of the COVID-19 pandemic in India damaged the BJP's image as the voters felt that they were not given desired help in getting the hospital beds and medical oxygen from their elected representatives. The sitting Councillors were accused of not being found to be approachable when the public needed support. Complaints that No major relief measure was taken by the local government were raised.

Economy

Chandigarh has been rated as one of the "Wealthiest Towns" of India. The Reserve Bank of India ranked Chandigarh as the third-largest deposit centre and seventh largest credit centre nationwide as of June 2012. Chandigarh's gross state domestic product for 2014–15 is estimated at ₹290 billion (short scale) (US$4.3 billion) at current prices. According to a 2014 survey, Chandigarh is ranked 4th in the top 50 cities identified globally as "emerging outsourcing and IT services destinations" ahead of cities like Beldon (Amritsar).

Employment
The government is a major employer in Chandigarh, with three governments having their base here, those being the Chandigarh Administration, the Punjab government and the Haryana government. A significant percentage of Chandigarh's population, therefore, consists of people who are either working for one of these governments or have retired from government service, mainly armed forces. For this reason, Chandigarh is often called a "Pensioner's Paradise". Ordnance Cable Factory of the Ordnance Factories Board has been set up by the government of India. There is about 15 medium-to-large industries, including two in the public sector. In addition, Chandigarh has over 2,500 units registered under the small-scale sector. The city's important industries are paper manufacturing, basic metals and alloys, and machinery. Other industries in the city are food products, sanitary ware, auto parts, machine tools, pharmaceuticals, and electrical appliances.

The main occupation here is trade and business. However, the Punjab and Haryana High Court, Post Graduate Institute of Medical Education and Research (PGIMER), the availability of an IT Park, and more than a hundred government schools provide other job opportunities to people.

Four major trade promotion organisations have their offices in Chandigarh. These are The Associated Chambers of Commerce & Industry, ASSOCHAM India in Sector 8, Chandigarh, Federation of Indian Chambers of Commerce & Industry, (FICCI) the PhD Chamber of Commerce and Industry and the Confederation of Indian Industry (CII) which has its regional headquarters at Sector 31, Chandigarh.

Chandigarh IT Park (also known as Rajiv Gandhi Chandigarh Technology Park) is the city's attempt to break into the information technology world. Chandigarh's infrastructure, proximity to Delhi, Haryana, Punjab, and Himachal Pradesh, and the IT talent pool attracts IT businesses looking for office space in the area. Major Indian firms and multinational corporations like Quark, Infosys, EVRY, TechMahindra, Airtel, Amadeus IT Group, DLF have set up base in the city and its suburbs.

The work of the Chandigarh Metro was slated to start by 2019. It was opposed by the Member of Parliament from Chandigarh, Kirron Kher. With an estimated cost of around $109 billion including 50% funds from the governments of Punjab and Haryana and 25% from Chandigarh and government of India, funds from the Japanese government were proposed to include approximately 56% of the cost. However, the project was turned down owing to its non-feasibility. Kher promised a film city for Chandigarh. After winning the seat, she said that she had difficulty in acquiring land in Chandigarh. Her proposal was accepted by the Chandigarh Administration and the film city is proposed to be set up in Sarangpur, Chandigarh. This has been considered as a source of employment in the future.

Culture

Festivals
Every year, in September or October during the festival of Navratri, many associations and organisations hold a Ramlila event, which has been conducted here for over 50 years.

The Rose Festival in Zakir Hussain Rose Garden every February shows thousands of subspecies of roses.

The Mango Festival is held during the monsoons, and other festivals are held at Sukhna Lake.

Transport

Road

Chandigarh has the largest number of vehicles per capita in India. Wide, well-maintained roads and parking spaces all over the city ease local transport. The Chandigarh Transport Undertaking (CTU) operates public transport buses from its Inter State Bus Terminals (ISBT) in Sectors 17 and 43 of the city. CTU also operates frequent bus services to the neighbouring states of Punjab, Haryana, Himachal Pradesh, and to Delhi.

Chandigarh is well-connected by road to the following nearby cities, by the following highway routes:
  NH 7 to Patiala in the southwest.
  NH 152 to Ambala and Kaithal in the south (NH 44 catches up from Ambala to Panipat-Delhi).
  NH 5 to Shimla in the northeast, and to Ludhiana in the west.

Air

Chandigarh Airport has scheduled commercial flights to the major cities of India. An international terminal was completed in 2015, and international flight routes to Dubai and Sharjah were started. The runway is located in Chandigarh, while the terminal is in Mohali. The governments of Punjab and Haryana each have a 24.5% stake in the international terminal building, while the Airports Authority of India holds a 51% stake.

Rail

Chandigarh Junction railway station lies in the Northern Railway zone of the Indian Railways network and provides connectivity to most of the regions of India. The railway station also serves the neighbouring town of Panchkula. There were long-standing proposals to develop a metro rail system in the city, which were formally scrapped in 2017.

Education

There are numerous educational institutions in Chandigarh. These range from privately and publicly operated schools to colleges. These include Panjab University, Post Graduate Institute of Medical Education and Research (PGIMER), Punjab Engineering College, National Institute of Technical Teacher Training 
and Research (NITTTR), Post Graduate Government College, and DAV College.

According to the Chandigarh administration's department of education, there are a total of 115 government schools in Chandigarh, including Government Model Senior Secondary School, Sector 16, Jawahar Navodaya Vidyalaya, Bhavan Vidyalaya, convent schools like St. Anne's Convent School, St. John's High School, Chandigarh, Sacred Heart Senior Secondary School and Carmel Convent School, and other private schools like Delhi Public School and D.A.V. Public School.

Sports

The Sector 16 Stadium has been a venue of several international cricket matches, but it has lost prominence after the PCA Stadium was constructed in Mohali. It still provides a platform for cricketers in this region to practice and play inter-state matches.

The Chandigarh Golf Club has a 7,202-yard, 18-hole course known for its challenging narrow fairways, dogleg 7th hole, and floodlighting on the first nine holes.

Tourist attractions
The main tourist attractions in Chandigarh are:

Natural landscape
Rock Garden of Chandigarh
Garden of Springs, Chandigarh
Zakir Hussain Rose Garden
Japanese Garden, Chandigarh
Parrot Bird Sanctuary, Chandigarh
Mahendra Chaudhary Zoological Park
Sukhna Lake
Sukhna Wildlife Sanctuary
Rose Festival (Chandigarh)
Heritage Trees of Chandigarh
Sukhna Interpretation Centre

Museums
Government Museum and Art Gallery, Chandigarh
Gandhi Bhawan, Chandigarh
Open Hand Monument

Architecture
Open Hand Monument
Palace of Assembly, Chandigarh
Chandigarh Capitol Complex
Secretariat Building, Chandigarh

Others
Sector-17, Chandigarh
Burail Fort
Manimajra Fort
Chandi Mandir
Elante Mall
Paras Downtown Square
Tagore Theatre

Postcolonial significance

Background
Nehru said of Chandigarh when he first visited the site of the new city in 1952: "Let this be a new town, symbolic of the freedom of India, unfettered by the traditions of the past, an expression of the nation's faith in the future". For Nehru, Chandigarh represented a vision of how a new planned city could be a canvas for the regeneration of the nation itself after centuries of oppression under British colonial rule and the dilution of Indian character from the nation's towns. Guided by the architectural optics of Le Corbusier, the development of Chandigarh was part of a state-driven exercise to break from the traditions of imperialism in city making and begin the process of healing from the injustices suffered.

To the extent that Chandigarh epitomises the destructive influence of the British, in the impetus of its creation as a solution to the otherwise violent partitioning of territory between India and Pakistan, it represents an early ideological symbol for the birth of India's future. The selection of the physical site involved an extensive vetting process. Many existing towns in Punjab were surveyed as options for the new capital and dismissed for poor performance concerning factors such as military defensibility and capacity for accommodating potential refugee influxes. The construction of a new town in Chandigarh was determined to be the best option due to its relative strength in these factors as well as its proximity to the national capital, New Delhi, its central location within the state of Punjab, its abundance of fecund land and its beautiful natural landscape.

Modernism in new town design
Off the back of this conflation of assets Chandigarh then was well poised to serve a function as a city-building project in national identity. From a federal policy perspective, the development of the new town became a tool in India for modernisation and an intended driver of economic activity, legal reform, and regional growth as well as a significant agent for the decolonisation project. As Britain's grip on their empire began to weaken their accelerated withdrawal between the beginning of the second world war and 1947 left their former colony in states of disarray and disorganisation, and policymakers for the new Indian government were required to contend with issues such as rapid rural depopulation, urban congestion, and poverty. As well as in Chandigarh this policy tool was implemented in the creation of new capital cities in Bhubaneswar and Gandhinagar, and more broadly throughout India in the 112 planned cities created between independence and 1971, purposed to absorb migration from those regions in demise after being abandoned by the British and provide hubs for growing industries such as in steel and energy.

These examples from a genealogy of utopian urban forms developed in post-independence India as a panacea for issues related to underdevelopment as well as post-independence complications to do with separatist religious conflict and the resulting diplomatic tensions. Chandigarh is the first example of a state-funded master-planned modernisation scheme. These "urban utopias" attempt to enforce nation-building policies through a federalised rule of law at a regional level, and diffuse postcolonial urbanism which codes justice in its design. The intent is that the economic success and progressivism of cities such as Chandigarh as a lightning rod for social change would gradually be emulated at the scale of the nation. Chandigarh was for Nehru and Le Corbusier an embodiment of the egalitarian potential offered by modernism, where the machine age would complete the liberation of the nation's citizens through the productive capacity of industrial technology and the relative ease of constructing civic facilities such as dams, hospitals, and schools; the very antithesis of the conservative and traditional legacy of colonialism. Though built as a state capital Chandigarh came to be focused on industry and higher education. The specialisation of these new towns in particular functions represents a crucial aspect of the modernisation process as a decolonising enterprise, in completing a national portfolio where each town forms a part of the utopian model for contemporary India.

The post-colonialism of Chandigarh is rooted in the transformation of the political ideas of those such as Nehru who generated a new Indian nationalism through the design of newly built forms. Scholars such as Edward Said have emphasised the sinister nature of nostalgia and the romanticisation of colonial architecture in newly independent colonies as artefacts that perpetuate the ideological legacy of the hegemony and replicate the hierarchy of power even after decolonisation. Insofar as modernism in architecture (which defined town planning under the Nehru era of rule) represents an active radical break from tradition and a colonial past even the very presence of Le Corbusier has been recognised as an indelible resistance to the British construction legacy, as he provided the first non-British influence on design thinking in India, enabling a generational shift in the contemporary cohort of architects and planners to be hired by the state throughout the rest of the century who were initiated under Modernist conditioning.

As early as the 1950s the presence of the International Style could be detected in the design of houses in India, "whether mistri or architect-designed". The development of low-cost housing was a priority for Chandigarh, and the modern forms designed by Corbusier are characterised by a dispensing with colonial forms focused on classic aesthetics and a refocusing on strategies such as using narrow frontages and orientation for minimising direct exposure to the sun and maximising natural ventilation and efficient cost while providing modern amenities in the International Style aesthetic. These developments are credited as the beginning of a "Chandigarh architecture", inspiring gradual experimentation with form and an "Indianising" of the International Style which precipitated the formation of the country's new cultural identity in town design.

Criticisms
Criticisms are well established regarding the implementation of the postcolonial vision of Nehru and Le Corbusier, and the critical emphasis on its influence. Claims have been made that the focus on Corbusier's architect-centred discourse erases the plural authorship of the narrative of Chandigarh's development, arguing that it was, in fact, hybridity of values and of "contested modernities" of Western and indigenous Indian origin and cultural exchanges rather than an uncontested administrative enterprise. Such criticism is consistent with claims that decolonisation in India has marked a shift from segregation based on race to segregation based on class, and that planned cities are truly "designed" ones which represent the values and interests of a westernised middle-class Indian elite which ignore the complexities of India's diverse ethnic and cultural landscape and enabled neocolonial hierarchies such as the imposition of the Hindi language on non-conforming castes. 

Brent C. Brolin argues that Le Corbusier ignored Indian preferences in designing the housing and communities and that the residents have done what they can to recreate their accustomed lifestyle. Furthermore, the early over-saturation of the minimalist International Style in building design in Chandigarh has attracted criticisms of effecting a "democratic, self-effacing banality", though this criticism is perhaps negligent of how this was necessary for galvanising higher standards of urban living throughout the country.

Notable people

 
 

 Sarbjit Bahga, architect, author, photo-artist
 Binny Bansal, founder of Flipkart, billionaire
 Sachin Bansal, founder of Flipkart, billionaire
 Neerja Bhanot, youngest Ashoka Chakra Awardee, flight attendant and model
 Sabeer Bhatia, Indian-American entrepreneur who founded Hotmail
 Jaspal Bhatti, Padma Bhushan awardee, film and TV actor and renowned satirist
 Abhinav Bindra, Olympic gold medalist
 Nek Chand, Indian artist and creator of the Rock Garden of Chandigarh
 Surveen Chawla, Punjabi film actress
 Gurleen Chopra, Punjabi actress
 Vivek Dahiya, actor
 Harita Kaur Deol, pilot
 Kapil Dev, former Indian international cricketer
 Harmeet Dhillon, American lawyer
 Mukesh Gautam, Punjabi film director
 Yami Gautam, Indian film actress
 Mahie Gill, Indian actress
 Sandesh Jhingan, Indian international professional footballer
 Mamta Joshi, Sufi singer
 Gurbani Judge, MTV India VJ and actress
 AJ Kanwar, award-winning dermatologist, former professor and head, PGI, Chandigarh
 Kirron Kher, Indian actress and theatre artist (also BJP M.P. from the city)
 Aparshakti Khurana, Indian film actor
 Ayushmann Khurrana, Indian film actor
 Rochak Kohli, music composer, singer, lyricist
 Sargun Mehta, Punjabi film actress
 Anjum Moudgil, Indian rifle Shooter
 Prince Narula, actor
 Ramesh Kumar Nibhoria, winner of Ashden Awards-UK
 Gul Panag, Indian film actress and social activist
 Neel Kamal Puri novelist, columnist
 Gajendra Pal Singh Raghava, bioinformatics scientist
 Kulraj Randhawa, Punjabi film actress
 Mohinder Singh Randhawa, a civil servant who had a major role in establishing Chandigarh
 Harnaaz Sandhu, winner of Miss Universe 2021
 Mohit Sehgal, TV actor
 Piare Lal Sharma, writer
 Jeev Milkha Singh, professional golfer
 Milkha Singh Commonwealth gold medalist.
 Yuvraj Singh, Indian international cricketer
 Pammi Somal, Bollywood journalist and filmmaker
 Sri Srinivasan, United States Circuit Judge of the United States Court of Appeals for the District of Columbia Circuit
 Manan Vohra, cricketer

See also
 Ambala Chandigarh Expressway
 Chandigarh capital region
 List of tourist attractions in Chandigarh
 Mohali
 New Chandigarh, Punjab
 Panchkula
 Pinjore
 Kaimbwala
 Navyug Ramlila and Dussehra Committee
 Emblem of Chandigarh

Explanatory notes

References

Further reading
 
 Fynn, Shaun. Chandigarh Revealed: Le Corbusier's City Today. Princeton Architectural Press, 2017. 
 Evenson, Norma. Chandigarh. Berkeley, CA: University of California Press, 1966.
 Sarbjit Bahga, Surinder Bahga (2014) Le Corbusier and Pierre Jeanneret: The Indian Architecture, CreateSpace, 
 Joshi, Kiran. Documenting Chandigarh: The Indian Architecture of Pierre Jeanneret, Edwin Maxwell Fry and Jane Drew. Ahmedabad: Mapin Publishing in association with Chandigarh College of Architecture, 1999. 
 Kalia, Ravi. Chandigarh: The Making of an Indian City. New Delhi: Oxford University Press, 1999.
 Maxwell Fry and Jane Drew. Chandigarh and Planning Development in India, London: Journal of the Royal Society of Arts, No.4948, 1 April 1955, Vol. CIII pages 315–333. I. The Plan, by E. Maxwell Fry, II. Housing, by Jane B. Drew.
 Nangia, Ashish. Re-locating Modernism: Chandigarh, Le Corbusier and the Global Postcolonial. PhD. Dissertation, University of Washington, 2008.
 Perera, Nihal. "Contesting Visions: Hybridity, Liminality, and Authorship of the Chandigarh Plan" Planning Perspectives 19 (2004): 175–199
 Prakash, Vikramaditya. Chandigarh's Le Corbusier: The Struggle for Modernity in Postcolonial India. Seattle: University of Washington Press, 2002.
 Sarin, Madhu. Urban Planning in the Third World: The Chandigarh Experience. London: Mansell Publishing, 1982.

External links

 Government
 The Official Website of Chandigarh Administration

 General information
 
 

 

Planned capitals
1948 establishments in India
Districts of Chandigarh
Indian union territory capitals
Le Corbusier buildings in India
Planned cities in India
Populated places established in 1948
States and union territories of India
Union territories of India
 
T
C